A canto is the principal form of division in a long poem. 

Canto or cantos or variation, may also refer to:

Places
 Canton Province, an older English name of Guangdong, in the South of China
 Capital city of Canton Province, an older English name of Guangzhou, the provincial capital of Guangdong
 Cantonese language
 Canto, alternative name of Cahto, California
 Port del Cantó, Catalonia, Spain; a mountain pass
 Monte Canto, Lombardy, Italy; a mountain
 Canto Alto, Lombardy, Italy; a mountain
 Canto River, Rio Grande do Norte, Brazil; a river

People
Surnamed "Canto"
 Alberto del Canto (1547-1608), Portuguese conquistador
 Alvaro Garcia Canto (born 1986), Spanish soccer player
 Blas Cantó (born 1991), Spanish singer
 Dean Canto (born 1980), Australian racing driver
 Estela Canto (1915-1994), Argentinian writer
 Félix González Canto (born 1968), Mexican politician
 Flávio Canto (born 1975), Brazilian athlete
 Gustavo Canto (born 1994), Argentine soccer player
 Ignacio Canto (born 1981), Spanish fencer
 Marilyne Canto (born 1963), French actress
 Miguel Canto (born 1948), Mexican boxing champion
 Toni Cantó (born 1965), Spanish actor

Surnamed "Cantos"
 Matilde Cantos (1898-1987), Spanish feminist
 Martín de Andújar Cantos (born 1602), Spanish sculptor

Music
 The highest vocal part, the air or melody, in a piece of choral music
 Canto-pop, Cantonese-language pop music
 Canto fermo, the melody forming the basis of a polyphonic composition
 Canto nuevo, a Latin American folk music style
 Canto (Charles Lloyd album), 1996
 Canto (Soler album), 2009
 Canto (Los Super Seven album), 2001
 Canto 34, A song by Five Finger Death Punch from their album War Is The Answer
 Van Canto, a German metal band

Other
 The Cantos, an epic poem by Ezra Pound
 Canto, the popular press division of the Cambridge University Press
 Canto (news aggregator), a terminal based feed reader
 Canto Software, a software company
 Canto (organization), 19th century Brazilian anti-slavery organizations
 Canto Collection, a series of paintings by Rob Mohlmann

See also

 Italian name for a corner where two streets meet. e.g. Canto ai Quattro Leoni, in Florence
 Canto General, Pablo Neruda's tenth book of poems
 Bel canto (disambiguation)
 Yo Canto (disambiguation)